A cake is a sweet, baked form of food.

Cake may also refer to:

Food  
 Birthday cake
 Cake dress
 Cheesecake
 Cupcake
 Crab cake
 Fishcake
 Meatcake
 Pancake
 Potato cake
 Potato pancake, or latke
 Radish cake
 Rice cake
 Space cake, a type of Cannabis edible
 Sponge cake
 Wedding cake

Arts, entertainment, and media

Fictional entities and plot elements
 Cake, a fictitious narcotic substance featured in the Brass Eye episode "Drugs"
 Cake, one of three hosts of Cake TV, played by Christa B. Allen
 Cake the Cat, a character in the Adventure Time TV series
 "The Cake", a plot element in the video game Portal

Films
 Cake (2005 film), starring Heather Graham
 Cake: A Wedding Story (2007)
 Cake (2014 film), starring Jennifer Aniston
 Cake (2018 film)
 Cake (2022 film), a Nigerian romantic comedy

Music

Groups
 Cake (band), an American alternative rock band
 The Cake, a 1960s American vocal trio

Works
 Cake (album), by The Trash Can Sinatras
 "Cake" (Flo Rida song), 2017
 "Cake", a song by Lily Allen from the 2018 album No Shame
 "Cake", a song by rapper Lloyd Banks from the 2006 album Rotten Apple
"Cake", a song by Bloem
 "Cake", a song by Melanie Martinez from the digital deluxe edition of the 2015 album Cry Baby
 ”Cake”, a single by Loren Gray in 2020
 "Cake", a song by Remi Wolf from the deluxe version of the 2021 album Juno

Other uses in arts, entertainment, and media
 Cake (advertisement), 2007, for the Skoda Fabia automobile
 Cake (2006 TV series), a sitcom/craft show on CBS
 Cake (2019 TV series), an adult animated/live-action variety show on FXX

Brands and enterprises
 CAKE, the NASDAQ ticker symbol for The Cheesecake Factory restaurant chain
 Cake Financial, a financial services social network

Other uses
 Cake (firework), also known as a candle barrage
 Cake Browser, a mobile web browser
 Cake number, the number of pieces into which a space can be cut
 CakePHP, a web development framework
 Press cake, or oil cake
 Urinal cake, a term describing a urinal deodorizer block
 Yellowcake, a mixture of uranium oxides
 Soap, bar soap

See also
Cakewalk (disambiguation)
Kake (disambiguation)